The 2014 ISAF Sailing World Championships, was held in Santander, Spain, this was the fourth edition of the ISAF Sailing World Championships. It is the world championships for all disciplines used at the upcoming Olympics. What gives this event greater significance is that it was used as qualification for the 2016 Summer Olympics in Brazil.

Bidding process
The following cities competed against Santander to win the right to host the Championships.

 Buenos Aires, Argentina
 Kingston, Ontario, Canada
 Qingdao, China
 Aarhus, Denmark
 Busan, South Korea
 The Hague, Netherlands
 Gdynia, Poland

Events and equipment
The following events were open for entries:

Summary

Medal table

Event medalists

References

External links
 Official Event Website 
 ISAF Microsite
 

 
2014
2014 in sailing
2014 in Spanish sport
Sport in Santander, Spain
Sailing competitions in Spain